Gavin Karl O'Reilly (born 17 December 1966) is a Dublin-born businessman with Irish and Australian citizenship. He is the son of Sir Tony O'Reilly and Susan Cameron.

O'Reilly is executive chairman of the London-based publication The New European, chairman of the consulting group Red Flag Consulting, and chairman of digital payment company Axate. He was formerly CEO of The Agency Group Limited and of the media group Independent News and Media PLC. From 2005-2011, he was the president of the World Association of Newspapers (2005–2011).

Early life
O'Reilly is the eldest of triplets, and the fourth of his parents' six children. He was born in Dublin and raised in Fox Chapel, Pittsburgh, and in Dublin. He was educated first at Harrow School and then at Clongowes Wood. He sat his Leaving Certificate exams in 1985, and then spent two years working at London advertising agency Doyle Dane Bernbach. O'Reilly went on to attend Georgetown University School of Business.

Career

INM
In 1993, O'Reilly joined the multinational media company Independent News and Media plc (INM), then the largest media group in Ireland, and led its "yellow page" division, the Independent Directory. In 1999, after working in several divisions, he was appointed CEO of the Irish operations of INM and oversaw the move of the company's production and logistic operations to Citywest Business Park in 2000. He became Group COO of INM in December 2001 and was appointed to its board of directors in 2004. He served as Chairman of APN News & Media from 2008 - 2012, a company in which INM held a controlling stake. In 2005, he led INM's investment into Jagran Prakashan Limited (JPL), one of India's media conglomerates which controlled by the Gupta family. O'Reilly served on the board of JPL from 2006-2014.

Following his father's retirement in 2009, O'Reilly was promoted to Group CEO of INM. In April 2012, he stepped down as chief executive of Independent News & Media, ending 39 years of direct control by his family of Ireland's largest media group.

Other roles 
In 2005, O'Reilly was elected President of the World Association of Newspapers (WAN). He orchestrated the merger of WAN with IFRA in 2009 to form the World Association of Newspapers and News Publishers, a representation body for the global newspaper and news industry. He was elected as the first President of the merged association and held the office until 30 June 2011. As the longest-serving President he now serves as an Honorary Member of the Executive Committee.

In 2013, O’Reilly was appointed Group CEO of The Agency Group Limited (now UTA Music), an independent music agency with a global roster of over 2,500 artists. In August 2015, O’Reilly headed the sale of The Agency Group to United Talent Agency, LLC. 

O'Reilly later took up a role as director of Bayard Capital LLC, a privately-owned technology investment firm. He has also served executive chairman of Red Flag Consulting, which specialises in strategic communications, government and public affairs, and crisis communications for Fortune 500 companies and other large corporations and associations in the US and across Europe.  He has also been chairman of Wemersive, a VR software solutions and services company. He became an investor in, and chair of, networked payment system Agate Systems Ltd, in 2018.

He is a founding member of United Europe, a non-profit association set up in 2013 by prominent European business people, politicians and analysis. It was initiated by Wolfgang Schüssel, the former Austrian chancellor who as president now heads the organisation, and Jürgen Grossman, a German entrepreneur, who serves as treasurer.

On 1 February 2021 he became chairman of The New European Limited, publisher of the eponymous weekly publication.

Former Roles 
He is also the former chairman of the National Newspapers of Ireland, BM Polyco (one of Europe's largest technical hand protection/ glove companies), and Dromoland Castle Holdings Limited, and a former director of Norkom Technologies PLC, a financial crime and compliance software integrator, investment holding company TVC PLC, PT Mahaka Media TBK (Indonesia) one of Indonesia's leading media companies, Ashford Castle Hotel and resort in Ireland, Cashcade Ltd., a bingo / online casino operator, iTouch PLC, and the Irish Heart Foundation, and a founding-director of Barretstown Gang Camp in Ireland.

Personal life
O'Reilly married model and actress Alison Doody on 25 June 1994, at the then family residence, Castlemartin. They lived at Bartra House, Dalkey, and had two daughters. They separated in 2004, and divorced in 2006.

In 2012, O'Reilly remarried to Danish national Christina Grimm. They have two children and live in Los Angeles.

References

1966 births
Living people
Businesspeople from County Dublin
Irish newspaper publishers (people)
People educated at Harrow School
People educated at Clongowes Wood College
Georgetown University alumni
People from Dalkey
O'Reilly Foundation
Gavin